Michigan Plateau is an undulating ice-covered plateau,  long, which rises to  at the western side of Reedy Glacier, Antarctica. The northern and eastern sides of the plateau are marked by the steep Watson Escarpment; the western and southern sides grade gradually to the elevation of the interior ice. It was mapped by the United States Geological Survey from ground surveys and U.S. Navy aerial photography, 1960–64, and was named by the Advisory Committee on Antarctic Names after the University of Michigan at Ann Arbor, which has sent numerous research personnel to work in Antarctica.

See also
Kirby Cone
Kivi Peak

References

Plateaus of Antarctica
Landforms of Marie Byrd Land
University of Michigan